Max Rendschmidt (born 12 December 1993) is a German Olympic canoeist. He represented his country at the 2016 Summer Olympics in Rio de Janeiro and won two gold medals, in K-2 1000 metres and K-4 1000 m events.

Career
He is a five-time world champion and seven-time European champion. On 1 November 2016, Rendschmidt received the Silver Laurel Leaf, the highest award for an athlete in Germany, from the German Federal President Joachim Gauck in Berlin. He works for the German Federal Police.

References

External links

Official Website

1993 births
Living people
German male canoeists
Canoeists at the 2016 Summer Olympics
Canoeists at the 2020 Summer Olympics
Olympic canoeists of Germany
Olympic gold medalists for Germany
Olympic medalists in canoeing
Medalists at the 2016 Summer Olympics
Medalists at the 2020 Summer Olympics
ICF Canoe Sprint World Championships medalists in kayak
Sportspeople from Bonn
European Games medalists in canoeing
European Games silver medalists for Germany
Canoeists at the 2015 European Games
Canoeists at the 2019 European Games